C'mon, Have A Go! was an Australian television game show broadcast on the Seven Network in 1985 and 1986. The show was hosted by Tony Young.

Contestants were drawn from the studio audience and encouraged to participate in games outside their declared area of expertise - using the show's title as a chanted catchphrase. Young would subject incorrect answers to a good-natured ribbing, drawing on his talents as a stand-up comedian.

When creator and lead producer Sandy Scott left to work on a revival of the Family Feud format for Seven, the network dropped a planned third season of C'mon from its 1987 lineup.  Tony Young resumed a radio career in his native Adelaide. Since 1995 he has worked as a media consultant.

Sources 
 
 

1980s Australian game shows
Seven Network original programming
1985 Australian television series debuts
1986 Australian television series endings